Diamond Cay is a tiny islet located just off Jost Van Dyke in the British Virgin Islands in the Caribbean. At low tide, it is connected by a sandbar to Jost Van Dyke. It was declared a national park in 1991. The Diamond Cay National Park provides habitat for pelicans, terns and boobies to nest.

References

Uninhabited islands of the British Virgin Islands
National parks of British Virgin Islands